The 2022–23 season is the 125th in the history of Royale Union Saint-Gilloise and their second consecutive season in the top flight. The club will participate in the Belgian First Division A, Belgian Cup, and UEFA Champions League.

Players

Out on loan

Transfers

In

Out

Pre-season and friendlies

Competitions

Overall record

First Division A

League table

Results summary

Results by round

Matches 
The league fixtures were announced on 22 June 2022.

Belgian Cup

UEFA Champions League

Third qualifying round 
The draw for the third qualifying round was held on 18 July 2022.

UEFA Europa League

Group stage 

The draw for the group stage was held on 26 August 2022.

Knockout phase

Round of 16 
The draw for the round of 16 was held on 24 February 2023.

References

Royale Union Saint-Gilloise seasons
Union Saint-Gilloise